The Monastery of Saint Maron (Syriac: Deir Mar Maroun), also called the Cave of the monks, is an ancient cavern initially developed as a refuge structure by the Romans and later used as a Maronite monastery and carved out of solid rock in the side of a cliff.

History

It consists of three levels with rock stairways, numerous altars, and small cells, suggested to have been the residence of Saint Maron and his early followers in the fourth century CE, during the foundation of the Maronite Church. It is suggested that Maron worked and even died in the monastery. Later occupation in Mamluk and Ottoman empire periods is attested by loopholes cut into the walls. The monastery is commonly thought to have been constructed by Romans, however the date, builders and origins of the structure are not certain.

The structure has fallen into disrepair, having been used as shelter for sheep, goats, and the occasional shepherd over the years. The cavern is located on land owned by the Ministry of Energy and Water of Lebanon, but has been the subject of an ongoing dispute between the Maronite Archdiocese and the Dandash family, who stakes an old claim on the land. The Maronite Archdiocese has retained rights to renovate the landmark and has stated intentions to begin a restoration project. The site has only reported to have been cleaned and no work has started on the monument, suggested to be of "national" importance.

It is noteworthy to pinpoint that historians Della Volpe and D'Ambrosio think that the structure built by the Romans in the second century was not a refuge but a defense fortification of the fertile Beqaa valley (colonised by Roman veterans in Pagus Augusti and in Heliopolis) against the Persian attacks from the north.

It is suggested that Maron worked there (with many disciples, including: James of Cyrrhus, Limnaeus, Domnina, Cyra, Marana, Abraham the Hermit) and even died in the monastery.

Even if greatly damaged during Arab conquest of the region, later occupation in Mamluk and Ottoman empire periods is attested by loopholes cut into the walls. The monastery is commonly thought to have been constructed by Romans, however the date, builders and origins of the structure are not certain.

The structure has fallen into disrepair, having been used as shelter for sheep, goats, and the occasional shepherd over the years.

Restoration
The cavern is located on land owned by the Ministry of Energy and Water of Lebanon, but has been the subject of an ongoing dispute between the Maronite Archdiocese and the Dandash family, who stakes an old claim on the land. The Maronite Archdiocese has retained rights to renovate the landmark and has stated intentions to begin a restoration project.

The site has only reported to have been cleaned and no work has started on the monument, even if suggested to be of national importance.

See also
 Maronites
 Roman Phoenicia

References

External links
 Deir Mar Maroun on satelliteviews.net
 Caves of "Raheb" on discoverlebanon.com
 Deir Mar Maroun on the Megalithic Portal
 Deir Mar Maroun on ikamalebanon.com
 Deir Mar Maroun Dispute - LBC News on YouTube
 Deir Mar Maroun on middleeast.com
 3D Google Map of Deir Mar Maroun on gmap3d.com
 Deir Mar Maroun photo
 Deir Mar Maroun photo

Hermel District
Archaeological sites in Lebanon
Beqaa Valley
Roman sites in Lebanon
Ancient Roman architecture
Maronite monasteries in Lebanon
Cave monasteries